Vârșolț is a commune located in Sălaj County, Crișana, Romania. It is composed of three villages: Recea (Krasznarécse), Recea Mică (Kisrécsepuszta) and Vârșolț.

At the 2002 census, 64.1% of inhabitants were Hungarians, 32.4% Romanians and 3.4% Roma. 58.6% were Reformed, 33.5% Romanian Orthodox, 3.5% Baptist and 1.9% Roman Catholic.

History 

The Reformed Church in Recea was completed in the 15th century.

The Reformed church in Vârșolț was completed in 1774.

Lake Vârșolț was built between 1976 and 1979.

References

Communes in Sălaj County
Localities in Crișana